Te Paea Selby-Rickit (born 14 January 1992) is a New Zealand netball player, who plays for the Mainland Tactix in the trans-Tasman ANZ Championship. Selby-Rickit comes from a sporting family. Her two sisters both play netball, including Steel defender Te Huinga Reo Selby-Rickit. Her father, Hud Rickit, is a former All Black lock and her brother Ngarongo Selby-Ricket plays for the University of Canterbury Yams.

Selby-Rickit with her siblings grew up in Ōtaki and is fluent in te reo Māori

References

New Zealand netball players
Southern Steel players
1992 births
Living people
Netball players at the 2018 Commonwealth Games
New Zealand international netball players
2019 Netball World Cup players
Commonwealth Games competitors for New Zealand
New Zealand Māori netball players
Te Paea
Mainland Tactix players
New Zealand international Fast5 players
Commonwealth Games medallists in netball
Commonwealth Games bronze medallists for New Zealand
Netball players at the 2022 Commonwealth Games
Medallists at the 2022 Commonwealth Games